This is a list of films which placed number one at the weekend box office for the year 2022.

Number-one films

Records

Highest-grossing films

Biggest opening weekends

Biggest opening and regular weekends

Certifications
Golden Ticket indicates that the film sold more than 300,000 tickets in a given calendar year. Austria Ticket is awarded to Austrian film productions with over 75,000 admissions.

References

See also
 Cinema of Austria

Austria
2022